Conquering Dystopia is the debut album by the instrumental technical death metal band Conquering Dystopia, digitally released on March 10, 2014. On July 8, 2014 Conquering Dystopia was made available on vinyl and released via Century Media Records.

History 
In early 2013 solo guitarist Keith Merrow announced via his Facebook page that he and former Nevermore guitarist Jeff Loomis would record an album together. In July 2013 Merrow and Loomis, now going by the name Conquering Dystopia, launched a crowdfunding campaign on Indiegogo in order to fund the recording of the album and announced that the band's lineup would also feature Cannibal Corpse bassist Alex Webster and former The Faceless drummer Alex Rüdinger. The campaign goal of $15,000 was reached in less than 24 hours.

In December 2013 Conquering Dystopia recorded the album at the Audio Hammer Studios with producer Mark Lewis.

Track listing

Personnel 
Conquering Dystopia
 Jeff Loomis - guitar
 Keith Merrow - guitar
 Alex Webster - bass
 Alex Rüdinger - drums

Guest musicians
 Ola Englund - guitar solo on "Totalitarian Sphere"
 Wes Hauch - guitar solo on "Autarch"

Production
 Mark Lewis - producer, mixing
 Eyal Levi - engineering

References

Conquering Dystopia albums
2014 debut albums
Albums produced by Mark Lewis (music producer)